The 2018–19 season is Blackburn Rovers' 131st season as a professional football club and it will participate in the Championship following promotion from League One the previous season. Along with competing in the Championship, the club will also participate in the FA Cup and EFL Cup. The season covers the period from 1 July 2018 to 30 June 2019.

Summer activity

May

On 14 May, Rovers confirmed their retained list. Danny Graham, Craig Conway, Lewis Mansell were offered new contracts whilst Rovers took up the option to extend Charlie Albinson's and Andrew Jackson's contracts by 12 months.

Elliott Ward, Liam Feeney, Aaron Dillon and scholars Matthew Campbell, Matthew Chan, Callum Dolan, Ben Donnelly-Blackburn, Frank Jones and Brad Lynch have been informed that they will not be retained by the club upon the expiration of their current contract/scholarship.

June

On 11 June Rovers announced striker Danny Graham had signed a new 12-month contract, until 2019, with the option of a further 12 months.

On 13 June Rovers announced midfielder Craig Conway signed a new 12-month contract, until 2019, with the option of a further 12 months.

On 22 June Rovers announced Rovers signed midfielder Joe Rothwell from Oxford United for an undisclosed fee on a three-year deal, until 2021. Also David Dunn left his role as the club's under-23 assistant manager.

July

On 2 July Rovers announced the signing of midfielder Jacob Davenport from Manchester City for an undisclosed fee on a 4-year deal, until 2022.

On 3 July Rovers announced that defender Darragh Lenihan had signed a new 4-year contract, until 2022.

On 12 July Rovers announced that defender Derrick Williams had signed a new 3-year contract, until 2021.

On 13 July Rovers announced that defender Richie Smallwood had signed a new 2-year contract, until 2020.

On 18 July Rovers announced that defender Scott Wharton had signed a new 3-year contract, until 2021.

On 20 July Rovers announced that attacking midfielder Bradley Dack had signed a new 3-year contract, until 2021.

On 22 July Rovers announced defender Scott Wharton has re-joined Lincoln City on loan until the end of the season.

On 30 July Rovers announced the signing of attacking midfielder Kasey Palmer from Chelsea on loan until the end of the season.

August

On 3 August Rovers announced defender Matthew Platt has joined Accrington Stanley on loan until the end of the season.

On 6 August Rovers announced the signing of attacker Adam Armstrong from Newcastle United for an undisclosed fee on a 4-year deal, until 2022.

On 23 August Rovers announced the signing of midfielder Jack Rodwell on a free transfer on a 12-month contract until 2019, following his release from Sunderland. Also Blackpool announced the signing of Liam Feeney following his release from Rovers in the summer.

On 27 August Rovers announced the signing of midfielder Harrison Reed from Southampton on loan until the end of the season.

On 28 August Rovers announced the signing of forward Ben Brereton from Nottingham Forest on loan until January, with the option to make his transfer permanent.

On 30 August Rovers announced defender Sam Hart had re-joined Rochdale on loan until the end of the season and midfielder Lewis Hardcastle had joined Port Vale on loan until the end of the season.

On 31 August Rovers announced that goalkeeper Andrew Fisher had signed a new 3-year contract, until 2021. It was also announced that Rovers had reached a mutual agreement with Paul Caddis and Peter Whittingham to terminate their contracts with immediate effect. Rovers also announced the signing of young forward Mitchel Candlin from Walsall on loan with the option to make the move permanent in January.

September

On 3 September Notts County announced the signing of Elliott Ward following his release in the summer.

On 4 September Rovers announced the deadline day signing of young attacking midfielder Brad Lyons from Coleraine  on loan until January, with the option to make his transfer permanent, had been approved.

On 7 September Rovers announced young development squad pair Lewis Thompson & Lewis Mansell have joined FC United on a 1-month loan until 6 October.

On 21 September Rovers announced young defender Jack Doyle has joined Maidstone United on a 3-month loan until 22 December.

On 28 September Rovers announced young goalkeeper Oliver Byrne have joined Bamber Bridge on a 1-month loan until 27 October.

October

On 8 October Rovers announced young development squad pair Lewis Thompson & Lewis Mansell will remain at FC United for a further month until 10 November.

On 26 October Rovers announced young goalkeeper Charlie Albinson have joined Warrington Town on a 1-month loan until 1 December.

November

On 9 November it was announced that defender Jack Doyle has returned from his loan spell from Maidstone United due to injury.

On 12 November Rovers announced youngster Lewis Thompson will remain at FC United for a further month until 15 December, while Lewis Mansell will return to the club following the end of his loan spell.

On 15 November Rovers announced that defender Charlie Mulgrew had signed a new 2 and half year contract, until 2021.

On 16 November Rovers announced that midfielder Elliott Bennett had signed a new 2 and half year contract, until 2021. Also Bradford City announced the signing of Paul Caddis following his release.

On 30 November Rovers announced manager Tony Mowbray had signed a new long-term contract putting pen to paper on a new 3 and half year deal, until 2020.

Winter activity

December

On 3 December Rovers announced u23 goalkeeper Charlie Albinson will remain at Warrington Town for a further month until 2 January.

On 10 December Rovers announced that u23 defender Joe Grayson had signed a new 2 and half year contract, until 2021.

On 13 December Rovers announced that midfielder Corry Evans had signed a new 2 and half year contract, until 2021.

January

On 2 January Rovers announced Matthew Platt and Sam Hart had been recalled from their loan spells from Accrington Stanley and Rochdale.

On 4 January Rovers announced the permanent signing of forward Ben Brereton from Nottingham Forest for an undisclosed fee on a 3 and half year deal, until 2022 and that forward Danny Graham had signed a one-year contract extension, until 2020.

On 7 January Rovers announced Lewis Hardcastle had been recalled from their loan spells from Port Vale.

On 9 January Rovers announced Kasey Palmer had been recalled by Chelsea, to join Bristol City on loan.

On 11 January Rovers announced the permanent signing of attacking midfielder Brad Lyons from Coleraine on an 18-month deal, until 2020.

On 14 January Rovers announced Mitchel Candlin had been recalled by Walsall. Also u23 goalkeeper Oliver Byrne had joined Stevenage on loan until the end of the season.

On 15 January Rovers announced that u23 attacking midfielder Brad Lyons had joined St Mirren on loan until the end of the season. Also defender Sam Hart had joined Southend United on loan until the end of the season.

On 16 January Rovers announced that u23 defender Sam Barnes had joined Marine on short loan deal until 14 February. Also u23 forward Lewis Mansell had joined Partick Thistle on loan until the end of the season.

On 18 January Rovers announced that defender Joe Grayson had joined Grimsby Town on loan until the end of the season.

On 22 January Rovers announced that defender Sam Hart had signed a 1-year contract extension, until 2020.

On 23 January Rovers announced that defender Scott Wharton has been recalled from his loan spell at Lincoln City & joined Bury on loan until the end of the season.

On 24 January Rovers announced that defender Paul Downing had joined Doncaster Rovers on loan until the end of the season.

On 28 January Rovers announced the signing of winger Harry Chapman from Middlesbrough for an undisclosed fee on a 2 and half year deal, until 2021.

On 30 January Rovers announced the signing of young Gibraltar international Louie Annesley from Lincoln Red Imps for an undisclosed fee on a 2 and half year deal, until 2021.

On 31 January Rovers announced u23 goalkeeper Oliver Byrne had joined Stevenage permanently, It was also announced that U23 pair Willem Tomlinson and Okera Simmonds had left the club by mutual consent.

February

On 1 February Rovers announced that u23 defender Tyler Magloire had signed a new 3 and half year contract, until 2022. It was also announced that Okera Simmonds had joined Accrington Stanley following his release.

On 4 February it was announced Willem Tomlinson had joined Mansfield Town following his release.

On 8 February Rovers announced that u23 goalkeeper Andy Fisher had joined FC United on a months loan. Also announced u23 midfielder Lewis Hardcastle had joined Barrow on a months loan. Rovers hosted an Hall of Fame event with the following players been introduced into it Ronnie Clayton, Bob Crompton, Bryan Douglas, Derek Fazackerley, Simon Garner, Alan Shearer & Brad Friedel.

On 9 February Rovers announced that u23 defender Matthew Platt had joined Southport on a months loan./

On 15 February Rovers announced that u23 defender Sam Barnes had signed his 1st professional contract putting pen to paper on a 2 and half year contract, until 2021.

On 20 February Rovers announced that u23 Canadian  midfielder Ben Paton had signed a new 1 and half year contract, until 2020.

March

On 1 March Rovers announced that u23 midfielder John Buckley had signed a new 3 and half year contract, until 2022.

On 5 March Rovers announced Indian forward Aniket Jadhav will join the academy for a 3-month training spell.

On 8 March Rovers announced that u23 goalkeeper Andy Fisher had extended his loan at FC United for a further month.

On 13 March Rovers announced that u23 pair Lewis Hardcastle & Matthew Platt had their loan spells extended, midfielder Hardcastle will remain at Barrow until 7 April & defender Platt will remain at Southport until 29 April.

On 16 March Rovers announced that u23 defender Lewis Thompson had signed a new deal until 2020.

On 21 March Rovers announced that u23 forward Daniel Butterworth had signed a new 3 and half year contract, until 2022.

On 27 March Rovers announced that u23 midfielder Stefan Mols had signed a new 2-year contract, until 2021.

On 28 March Rovers announced that u23 midfielder Lewis Hardcastle had joined Barrow permanently.

April

On 2 April Rovers announced that u23 defender Charley Doyle had signed a new 12-month contract, until 2020.

On 4 April Rovers announced that u23 midfielder Joe Rankin-Costello had signed a new 2-year contract, until 2021.

On 23 April Rovers announced that defender Ryan Nyambe had signed a new contract until 2021.

On 31 April Rovers held their end of season awards the winners follow:

Young Player – Lewis Travis,
Players’ Player – Danny Graham,
Best Newcomer – Harrison Reed,
Unsung Hero – Damien Johnson,
Man of the Match (Seasonal) – Darragh Lenihan,
Goal of the Season – Joe Rothwell,
Player of the Year – Danny Graham.

May

On 11 May Rovers announced that defender Matthew Platt had signed a new 1-year contract until 2020.

Squad information

Pre-season friendlies

Blackburn Rovers announced six pre-season friendlies against Scottish Premiership side Hibernian, EFL League Two's Port Vale, Champions League finalists Liverpool, EFL League Two's Lincoln City, Premier League side Everton and newly promoted EFL League One side Accrington Stanley,

Championship season

League table

Results summary

Results by matchday

Matchday
On 21 June 2018, the Championship fixtures for the forthcoming season were announced.

EFL Cup

Rovers entered the EFL Cup in the first round and were drawn away to Carlisle United. The second round draw was made from the Stadium of Light on 16 August. The third round draw was made on 30 August 2018 by David Seaman and Joleon Lescott.

FA Cup

The third round draw was made live on BBC by Ruud Gullit and Paul Ince from Stamford Bridge on 3 December 2018.

Backroom staff

1st Team squad statistics

|-
|colspan="14"|Players out on loan:  

|-
|colspan="14"|Players that played for Blackburn Rovers this season that have left the club: 

|}

Goalscorers

Transfers

Summer

Transfers in 

Total outgoing: +/- ~£ 1,750,000+

Transfers out 

Total incoming: +/- ~£ 0

Loans in

Loans out

Winter

Transfers in 

Total outgoing: +/- ~£

Transfers out 

Total incoming: +/- ~£ 0

Loans in

Loans out

References

Blackburn Rovers F.C. seasons
Blackburn Rovers